Nels Anderson (March 17, 1828 –  February 22, 1887) was a member of the Wisconsin State Assembly.

Anderson was born in Kragerø, Norway. During the American Civil War, he was a first lieutenant with the 47th Wisconsin Volunteer Infantry Regiment of the Union Army. He later became a merchant in Scandinavia, Wisconsin. He was married to Birgit Anderson (1833–1879). They were the parents of nine children. He died in 1887 and was buried in  the Scandinavian Lutheran Cemetery in Waupaca County, Wisconsin

Assembly career
Anderson was a member of the Assembly during the 1880 session. He defeated the incumbent, John Scanlon, for election. Anderson was a Republican.

References

1828 births
1887 deaths
People from Kragerø
Politicians from Telemark
People from Scandinavia, Wisconsin
Norwegian emigrants to the United States
People of Wisconsin in the American Civil War
Republican Party members of the Wisconsin State Assembly
Union Army officers
American Lutherans
19th-century American businesspeople
19th-century American politicians
19th-century Lutherans